Levitate is the tenth studio album by Bruce Hornsby. It was Hornsby's third studio album with his touring band, Bruce Hornsby and the Noisemakers, and was his first release with Verve Records.

Somewhat a musical departure for Hornsby and the Noisemakers, Levitate features no piano solos. Many of the songs also feature lyrical motifs of science and nature. Several songs were co-written with Chip DeMatteo for a stage musical titled SCKBSTD.

The title track was used in Spike Lee's documentary Kobe Doin' Work. Invisible was featured in the Bobcat Goldthwait movie World's Greatest Dad, in which Hornsby also made a cameo appearance as himself.

Much like the 2004 release Halcyon Days, Levitate features guest artists and those close to Hornsby, most notably Eric Clapton, Hornsby's twin sons Russell and Keith, Grateful Dead lyricist Robert Hunter, and Hornsby's nephew R.S. Hornsby, who was killed in a car accident less than a week after recording a memorable guitar solo on "Continents Drift." The album has been dedicated to his memory.

Track listing
 "The Black Rats of London" (B.R. Hornsby) - 4:16
 "Prairie Dog Town" (B.R. Hornsby, Pharrell Williams, Calvin Broadus, Chad Hugo) - 4:14
 "Cyclone" (B.R. Hornsby, Robert Hunter) - 4:45
 "Continents Drift" (B.R. Hornsby, Chip DeMatteo) - 7:22
 "Paperboy" (B.R. Hornsby, Chip DeMatteo) - 5:04
 "Invisible" (B.R. Hornsby) - 3:36
 "Levitate" (B.R. Hornsby, Thomas Newman (Score from The Shawshank Redemption)) - 3:36
 "Here We Are Again" (B.R. Hornsby, Chip DeMatteo) - 3:55
 "Space is the Place" (Sonny Emory, J.V. Collier, B.R. Hornsby) - 4:24
 "Michael Raphael" (B.R. Hornsby, Chip DeMatteo) - 2:54
 "Simple Prayer" (B.R. Hornsby, Chip DeMatteo) - 4:04
 "In The Low Country" (B.R. Hornsby) - 4:38
 "I Truly Understand" [Bonus Track] (B.R. Hornsby) - 2:07

Personnel 
 Bruce Hornsby – lead vocals, acoustic piano, keyboards, dulcimer
 John "J. T." Thomas – keyboards, organ, guitar
 Doug Derryberry – guitar
 Blake Mills – guitar (1, 3, 9, 10, 12)
 R. S. Hornsby – guitar solo (4)
 Eric Clapton – guitar solo (9)
 J. V. Collier – bass
 Sonny Emory – drums, samples
 Bobby Read – saxophones, clarinet
 Andy Leftwich – fiddle (1)
 Floyd Hill, Jr. – backing vocals (1, 2)
 Eric Jackson – backing vocals 
 Tim Smith – backing vocals 
 12-year-old Keith and Russell Hornsby – vocals and rap (9)

Production 
 Producers – Bruce Hornsby and Tony Berg
 Production Assistant – Patti Oates Martin
 A&R – Evelyn Morgan 
 Recorded and Mixed by Shawn Everett and Wayne Pooley 
 Mastered by Stephen Marcussen at Marcussen Mastering (Hollywood, CA).
 Release Coordination – Lisa Hansen, Andy Kman and John Newcott. 
 Art Direction – Hollis King
 Graphic Design – Sachico Asano
 Cover Art – Kathy Hornsby
 Photography – Christian Amonson, Katherine Fisher and Carey Wilheim.
 Management – John Scher
 Road Crew – Reggie Bankston, Peter Banta, Caldwell Gray, Chuck Keith and Wayne Pooley.

Charts

References 

2009 albums
Bruce Hornsby albums
Albums produced by Tony Berg
Verve Records albums